Joseph Spiteri (born 6 May 1973) is an Australian former soccer player who played at both professional and international levels as a striker.

Personal life 
Spiteri is of Maltese descent and lives in a Maltese neighbourhood of a Sydney suburb.

Career 
Spiteri played at club level in Australia, Austria, Belgium and Sweden for Albion Rovers, Parramatta Eagles, Melbourne Knights, Sturm Graz, Lierse, IFK Norrköping, Sydney Olympic, Marconi Stallions and Kingston City. While at Lierse he helped them win the 1998–99 Belgian Cup, scoring in the final against Standard Liège. During his time in Belgium, he was known as "Joe The Kangaroo".

He also earned eight caps for Australia, and participated at the 1996 Summer Olympics.

International goals 
Scores and results list Australia's goal tally first.

Honours
Lierse SK
 Belgian Cup: 1998–99

References 

1973 births
Living people
Australian soccer players
Australia international soccer players
Olympic soccer players of Australia
Australian people of Maltese descent
Association football forwards
1996 OFC Nations Cup players
Footballers at the 1996 Summer Olympics
Parramatta FC players
Melbourne Knights FC players
SK Sturm Graz players
Lierse S.K. players
IFK Norrköping players
Sydney Olympic FC players
Marconi Stallions FC players
Kingston City FC players
Point Cook SC players
Australian expatriate soccer players
Australian expatriate sportspeople in Austria
Expatriate footballers in Austria
Australian expatriate sportspeople in Belgium
Expatriate footballers in Belgium
Australian expatriate sportspeople in Sweden
Expatriate footballers in Sweden